Henry Morley (2 March 1785 – 6 December 1857) was an English cricketer who played for Sussex County from 1815 to 1838, and also played one match for Kent and Sussex in 1836.

A builder by trade, he was a team-mate of William Lillywhite and Jem Broadbridge, and was a member of the Sussex team which played during the 1827 Roundarm Trial Matches against England.

Henry, a right-handed batsman, played in 30 first-class matches, and scored 285 runs during 57 innings, with a batting average of 5.18. By no means an exceptional player, his highest score of 18 runs came during his last match for the team against Kent at the Old County Ground, Town Malling on 19 July 1838. He was caught out by Alfred Mynn, the fourth greatest cricketer of all time according to the cricket writer John Woodcock.

Biography

Henry was born on 2 March 1785 in Amberley, Sussex, and was the son of John and Elizabeth Morley. He was baptised on 17 April 1785 in Amberley.

He married Frances Load Shelley (born 1781, Lewes, Sussex) at St Nicholas Church, Brighton on 26 August 1804. The couple had 9 children over the next 20 years. The children were: Elizabeth (1805), Hannah (1811), Henry (1813), Frederick (1815), James (1816), Isaac (1818), Edward (1819), Alfred (1822), and Frances Mary, born in 1825.

His wife Frances died in 1846 at the age of 65. Henry outlived her by 11 years, and died on 6 December 1857 in Brighton.

External links 
 CricketArchive 
 CricInfo

1785 births
1857 deaths
English cricketers of 1787 to 1825
English cricketers of 1826 to 1863
English cricketers
Sussex cricketers
People from Amberley, West Sussex